Doris Packer (May 30, 1904 – March 31, 1979) was an American actress, possibly best known for her recurring role as Mrs. Cornelia Rayburn, Theodore Cleaver's elementary school principal in the television series, Leave It to Beaver.

Packer portrayed the mother of millionaire playboy Chatsworth Osborne, Jr. on CBS's The Many Loves of Dobie Gillis. Earlier, she played Clarice Armitage, mother of Milton Armitage, whose character on the series Osborne replaced. In most of her screen roles, she was known for her aristocratic and intellectual bearing and precise use of the English language.

Background
Packer was born in Menominee, Michigan. Her family moved to southern California when she was quite young. She became interested in acting while in high school. After attending the University of California at Los Angeles, she moved to New York City to study under noted drama teacher Evelyn Thomas. Packer also appeared in Broadway shows.

During World War II, Packer enlisted in the U.S. Army Women's Army Corps (WACs), joining in 1943 as a Private and eventually reaching the rank of Technical Sergeant.

Her discharge records were likely lost in the 1973 fire at the Military Personnel Records Center.

In 1954, she appeared as Florence on an episode ("Sixteen Vertical") of Rod Cameron's crime drama series, City Detective. In 1955–1956, Packer appeared three times as a nurse in the NBC sitcom It's a Great Life, featuring Frances Bavier. In 1958, she guest-starred on Rod Cameron's subsequent syndicated series, State Trooper, in "The Last Stage Robbery", an episode with a surprise ending.

Packer played wealthy society matrons on The George Burns and Gracie Allen Show and I Love Lucy and Mrs. Wiley on The Andy Griffith Show. She had a recurring role as Clara Mason in the 1960-61 sitcom Happy. Packer played Mrs. McGillicuddy in the 1961 episode "Gladys' Political Campaign" on the CBS sitcom Pete and Gladys.

She appeared in an episode of The Twilight Zone entitled "I Sing the Body Electric".  She played the wealthy Mrs Huntingdon in a 1963 episode "I'm No Henry Walden!" on CBS's The Dick Van Dyke Show. She appeared on three episodes of The Beverly Hillbillies as wealthy matron Mrs. Fenwick.  She made a guest appearance on Perry Mason in 1962 as Mrs. Campion in "The Case of the Polka Dot Pony".

During the first season of Petticoat Junction in 1964, Packer appeared in the thirtieth episode, titled "Kate and the Dowager".  She portrayed a hotel guest whom Kate Bradley was trying to impress.

Packer appeared on NBC's anthology series, The Barbara Stanwyck Show. In 1964–1965, Packer appeared on the  short-lived CBS sitcom, Many Happy Returns, starring John McGiver and set in the complaint division of a fictitious Los Angeles department store with the unlikely name of Crockmyer's. In 1965 she appeared in the episode, 'We Love You, Miss Pringle' in My Favorite Martian: Season 2, Episode 26. In 1973, she guest-starred in an episode of the situation comedy A Touch of Grace.

Family
Packer was married to stage director Rowland G. Edwards for twenty-five years — from September 29, 1928 until his death on August 10, 1953. The couple had no children.

Death
She died, aged 74, in 1979 in Glendale, California, of natural causes.  Her grave marker notes her military service.

Filmography

References

1904 births
1979 deaths
Actresses from Greater Los Angeles
Actresses from Michigan
People from Menominee, Michigan
Military personnel from Michigan
American film actresses
American stage actresses
American television actresses
Women's Army Corps soldiers
University of California, Los Angeles alumni
20th-century American actresses